Admiral Sir John Durnford  (6 February 1849 – 13 June 1914) was a Royal Navy officer who went on to be Commander-in-Chief, Cape of Good Hope Station.

Naval career
Educated at Eton College and the Royal Naval College, Dartmouth, Durnford joined the Royal Navy in 1862 served in the Third Anglo-Burmese War of 1885 to 1886 for which he was mentioned in dispatches and awarded the DSO. Promoted to Captain in 1888, he commanded the torpedo school HMS Vernon from 1895 to 1899. In October 1899 he was appointed in command of the pre-dreadnought battleship HMS Jupiter, serving in the Channel Fleet, and in December the following year he was appointed to Algiers for the Medway steam reserve.

Durnford became Junior Naval Lord in February 1901 and was promoted to Rear admiral on 1 January 1902. He served as Commander-in-Chief, Cape of Good Hope Station from 1904 to 1907. He was President of the Royal Naval College, Greenwich from 1908 to 1911 and retired in 1913.

He lived at Elmshurst in Fareham.

Family
In 1881 he married Mary Louisa Eleanor Kirwan; they had one son and three daughters.

References

External links
 

|-

|-

1849 births
1914 deaths
People educated at Eton College
Royal Navy admirals
Knights Grand Cross of the Order of the Bath
Companions of the Distinguished Service Order
Lords of the Admiralty
Admiral presidents of the Royal Naval College, Greenwich